The Parfitt Brothers were architects in Brooklyn, New York CIty. The firm included three brothers, Henry, Walter and Albert, who were born in  Frome, England. They were "one of Brooklyn’s best and busiest architectural firms of the late 19th and early 20th" centuries. They designed row houses, mansions, apartment buildings, public offices, commercial buildings and churches. Their work includes two buildings listed on the National Register of Historic Places: Moody Mansion in Pittston, Maine and the Tree Studio Building and Annexes in Chicago.

Albert E. Parfitt was born in 1863 and died at his home in Brooklyn on October 18, 1926.

Work
Tree Studio Building and Annexes NRHP listed

Moody Mansion (Pittston, Maine) NRHP listed
The Montague, Grosvenor, and Berkeley apartment building.

Tower of St. Augustine in Brooklyn
Franklin Building (1890) at 186 Remsen
YMCA building (1885) on Fulton St and Bond (1885), 
Liebmann Building on Fulton St. at Hoyt (altered since)
Vosburgh Mfg Co. building (1888) on Fulton Street (1888), part of Abraham and Strauss in 1893

Knickerbocker Field Club (1893) in Prospect Park South 
Firehouse for Engine Co. 252 (1892) on Central Avenue in Bushwick
 Engine Co. 253 building (1895-1896) on 86th St. in Bensonhurst
 Baptist Home in Bedford Stuyvesant, new wing, (1901) 
13th Regiment Armory, new wing, (1906) on Sumner St. in Bedford Stuyvesant in 1906
Sheltering Arms Nursery orphanage on Dean Street
Truslow House (1887-1888) at 96 Brooklyn Avenue at Brooklyn Avenue and Dean Street, a New York City Landmark

166 5th Avenue (1910)
6 Pierrepont Street (1890) between Hicks Street and Pierrepoint Place in Brooklyn Heights for Mrs. Hallie I. James, Romanesque Revival style

Gallery

References

Defunct architecture firms based in New York City
Companies based in Brooklyn